Gerard Addington D'Arcy-Irvine (17 June 1862 – 18 April 1932) was the Bishop coadjutor of Sydney.

D'Arcy-Irving was born in Wandsworth into an ecclesiastical family  and educated at Napier Grammar School and Moore College. He was ordained in 1885 and began his ordained ministry as a curate at St Stephen's, Newtown, Sydney and St John's, Parramatta. He was then an incumbent at St Matthew's, Windsor, SS Simon and Jude's Bowral, St Michael's, Wollongong, Holy Trinity (Garrison) Church, Sydney and St Michael's Vaucluse and Rose Bay. In 1908 he became Archdeacon of Cumberland and in 1917 vicar general of the Sydney diocese. He was elevated to the episcopate in 1926 and died on 18 April 1932.

References

1862 births
People from Wandsworth
Moore Theological College alumni
Anglican archdeacons in Australia
20th-century Anglican bishops in Australia
Assistant bishops in the Anglican Diocese of Sydney
1932 deaths